Los is a locality situated in Ljusdal Municipality, Gävleborg County, Sweden with 332 inhabitants in 2020.

The village is known for its 18th-century cobalt mine, where Axel Fredrik Cronstedt discovered the chemical element of nickel in 1751. Today, the mine is a tourist attraction.

An 8-kilometre-wide crater on Mars was officially named after this village in 1979. The crater is located at 35.4°S and 76.3°W on the Martian surface.

References 

Populated places in Ljusdal Municipality
Hälsingland